The International FJ is a Dutch sailboat that was designed by Uus Van Essen and Conrad Gülcher as a trainer and one design racer, first built in 1956.

The boat was initially called the Flying Dutchman Junior (after the Flying Dutchman  one design racer), as it was designed as a trainer for that Olympic sailing class boat. It was later called the Flying Junior. In 1980 the name was again officially changed to the International FJ.

The design became a World Sailing accepted International class in 1972-73.

Production
The design has been built by a large number of companies including Grampian Marine and Paceship Yachts in Canada, Chantier Naval Costantini in France, Alpa Yachts, Centro Nautico Adriatico, Comar Yachts and Nautivela in Italy, Advance Sailboat Corp, W. D. Schock Corp, Whitecap Composites and Zim Sailing in the United States.

4,600 boats have been built.

W. D. Schock Corp records indicate that they built 70 boats between 1968 and 1972.

It remains in production by Centro Nautico Adriatico, Zim Sailing and Whitecap Composites.

Design

The International FJ is a racing sailing dinghy, with early versions built from wood. Fiberglass was class-authorized in 1960.

The boat has a fractional sloop rig, a raked stem, a plumb transom, a transom-hung rudder controlled by a tiller and retractable centerboard. It displaces .

The boat is sailed with a crew of two sailors. A single trapeze is available for use by the crew.

The Club FJ is a version with heavier construction but similar dimensions produced by Zim Sailing.

Whitecap Composites produces a lightened version of the design with improved ergonomics, marketed as the "Turbo FJ".

Operational history
The boat is supported by an active class club that organizes racing events, the International FJ Class.

See also
List of sailing boat types

Related development
Flying Dutchman (dinghy)

References

External links

Official website - FJ - Centro Nautico Adriatico
Official website - Club FJ - Zim Sailing
Official website - Turbo FJ - Whitecap Composites

Dinghies
1950s sailboat type designs
Classes of World Sailing
Two-person sailboats
One-design sailing classes
Sailboat type designs by Conrad Gülcher 
Sailboat type designs by Uus Van Essen
Sailboat types built by Grampian Marine
Sailboat types built by Paceship Yachts
Sailboat types built by Chantier Naval Costantini
Sailboat types built by Alpa Yachts
Sailboat types built by Centro Nautico Adriatico
Sailboat types built by Comar Yachts
Sailboat types built by Nautivela
Sailboat types built by Advance Sailboat Corp
Sailboat types built by W. D. Schock Corp
Sailboat types built by Whitecap Composites
Sailboat types built by Zim Sailing